Hawkshaw may refer to:

People
 Alan Hawkshaw (1937–2021), British composer and performer
 Ann Hawkshaw (1812–1885), English poet
 Benjamin Hawkshaw (died 1738), Irish Anglican divine
 Dean Hawkshaw (born 1997), Scottish footballer
 Hawkshaw Hawkins (1921–1963), country music singer
 John Hawkshaw (1811–1891), English engineer
 John Clarke Hawkshaw (1841–1921), son of the above, also an engineer
 Kirsty Hawkshaw (born 1969), British dance/electronica/house artist and songwriter
 Sarah Hawkshaw (born 1995), Irish hockey player

Places
 Hawkshaw Bridge, a cable-stayed suspension bridge in New Brunswick, Canada.
 Hawkshaw, Greater Manchester, a small village in the north-west of England.
 Hawkshaw, New Brunswick
 Hawkshaw, Scottish Borders, a settlement named after an ancestral family home near Tweedsmuir, Scotland.
 Hawkshaw, South Australia, a government town in the locality of Moockra.
 Hundred of Hawkshaw, a cadastral unit in the Northern Territory of Australia.

Other
 Hawkshaw the Detective, comic strip character
 Little Miss Hawkshaw, 1921 American drama film